The 1985 Georgia Bulldogs football team represented the University of Georgia during the 1985 NCAA Division I-A football season.

Schedule

Roster
Lars Tate, So.

Game summaries

Baylor

vs. No. 1 Florida

at No. 14 Auburn

References

Georgia
Georgia Bulldogs football seasons
Georgia Bulldogs football